The Grumman C-2 Greyhound is a twin-engine, high-wing cargo aircraft designed to carry supplies, mail, and passengers to and from aircraft carriers of the United States Navy. Its primary mission is carrier onboard delivery (COD). The aircraft provides critical logistics support to carrier strike groups. The aircraft is mainly used to transport high-priority cargo such as jet engines and special stores, mail, and passengers between carriers and shore bases.

Prototype C-2s first flew in 1964, and production followed the next year. The initial Greyhound aircraft were overhauled in 1973. In 1984, more C-2As were ordered under designation Reprocured C-2A or C-2A(R). In 2010, all C-2A(R) aircraft received updated propellers (from four to eight blades) and navigational updates (glass cockpit). The U.S. Navy is to start to replace the remaining 27 C-2As with 38 CMV-22Bs in 2020 with full fielding in 2028.

Design and development

Origins

The C-2 Greyhound, a derivative of the E-2 Hawkeye, shares the Sto-Wings and engines with the E-2, but has a widened fuselage with a rear loading ramp. The first of two prototypes flew in 1964. After successful testing, Grumman began production of the aircraft in 1965. The C-2 replaced the piston-engine Grumman C-1 Trader in the carrier onboard delivery (COD) role. The original C-2A aircraft were overhauled to extend their operational life in 1973.

Powered by two Allison T56 turboprop engines, the C-2A can deliver up to 10,000 pounds (4,500 kg) of cargo or up to 28 passengers, and is normally configured for a cargo/passenger mix. It can also carry litter patients in medical-evacuation missions. A cage system or transport stand restrains cargo during carrier launch and landing accelerations to prevent weight redistribution, which might adversely affect in-flight stability. The large aft cargo ramp and door and a powered winch allow straight-in rear cargo loading and unloading for fast turnaround.  The Greyhound's ability to airdrop supplies and personnel, fold its wings, and generate power for engine starting and other uses provide an operational versatility found in no other cargo aircraft. Some parts commonality with the E-2 Hawkeye and the Grumman A-6 Intruder ease logistics support.

The C-2 has four vertical stabilizers, of which three are fitted with rudders. A single vertical stabilizer large enough for adequate directional control would have made the aircraft too tall to fit on an aircraft carrier hangar deck. The four-stabilizer configuration has the advantage of placing the outboard rudder surfaces directly in line with the propeller wash, providing effective yaw control down to low airspeeds, such as during takeoff and landing. The inner-left stabilizer lacks a rudder, and has been called the "executive tail", as it has nothing to do compared to the other three. A single C-2 (2797) was equipped with an air-to-air refueling probe, but this was not installed in other aircraft.

In 1984, the Navy ordered 39 new C-2A aircraft to replace older airframes. Dubbed the Reprocured C-2A or C-2A(R) due to the similarity to the original, the new aircraft has airframe improvements and better avionics. The older C-2As were phased out in 1987, and the last of the new models was delivered in 1990.

Upgrades
The 36 C-2A(R)s underwent a critical service life extension program (SLEP). The C-2A(R)'s lifespan was 10,000 hours, or 15,000 carrier landings; plans require the C-2A to perform its mission supporting battle group operational readiness through 2015. The lower landing limit was approaching for most airframes, and the SLEP will increase their projected life to 15,000 hours or 36,000 landings. Once complete, the SLEP will allow the 36 aircraft to operate until 2027. The SLEP includes structural improvements to the center wing, an eight-bladed NP2000 propeller, navigational upgrades including the addition of GPS and the dual CAINS II navigation system, the addition of crash-survivable flight-incident recorders, and a ground proximity warning system. The first upgraded C-2A(R) left NAVAIR Depot North Island on 12 September 2005, after sitting on the ground for three and a half years while the SLEP was developed and installed. All aircraft were to receive the SLEP by 2015.

In November 2008, the company also obtained a $37M contract for the maintenance, logistics, and aviation administration services over five years for the C-2A fleet assigned to VX-20 test and evaluation squadron at Patuxent River. Northrop Grumman worked on an upgraded C-2 version, and offered to modernize the fleet with components common to the E-2D Hawkeye.

Operational history

Between November 1985 and February 1987, VR-24 (former Navy Transport Squadron) and its seven reprocured C-2As demonstrated the aircraft's exceptional operational readiness. The squadron delivered  of cargo,  of mail, and 14,000 passengers in the European and Mediterranean theaters. The C-2A(R) also served the carrier battle groups during Operations Desert Shield and Desert Storm during the Gulf War, as well as Operation Enduring Freedom during the war in Afghanistan.

On 2 June 2011, the US Navy loaned two C-2A(R) Greyhounds from VRC-40 (USN BuNos 162143 and 162165) to the French Navy. The two aircraft were stationed at Toulon-Hyères Airport, Hyères, to assist in improving the flow of logistics and supplies to the  operating in the Mediterranean Sea off Libya in support of the NATO intervention in Libya. After 16 days, both aircraft returned to the U.S. via Shannon Airport, Ireland, on 18 June 2011.

Replacement
The Common Support Aircraft was once considered as a replacement for the C-2, but failed to materialize. The U.S. Navy was exploring a replacement for the C-2 in September 2009. Three options were suggested as replacements for the aging C-2s: a new batch of updated C-2s, a transport version of the Lockheed S-3 Viking, and the tilt-rotor Bell Boeing V-22 Osprey.

The C-2 competed with the V-22 Osprey for use as the future COD aircraft. Northrop Grumman proposed modernizing the C-2 by installing the same wings, glass cockpit, and engines as the E-2D Advanced Hawkeye. Adopting the E-2D's cockpit would deliver a 10% savings on lifetime logistical support. Northrop Grumman stated that their approach could cost far less than the V-22, including saving $120 million from C-2 and E-2D commonality.

In February 2015, the Navy's FY 2016 budget confirmed the V-22's selection for the COD mission, replacing the C-2A. The Navy is to order 44 of the Osprey, designated CMV-22B, with deliveries to start in 2020. The C-2 was originally planned to be retired in 2027, but this was accelerated to 2024. The fleet is expected to be fully transitioned to the Osprey by 2028.

Variants

YC-2A
Prototype, two converted from E-2A Hawkeyes with redesigned fuselage
C-2A
Production variant, 17 built
C-2A(R)
"Reprocured" C-2A with improved systems based on the E-2C variant, 39 built

Operators

United States Navy
VAW-110 1987 to 1994
VAW-120
VRC-30
VRC-40
VX-20
VRC-50 1966 to 1994
VR-24

Accidents
 On 29 April 1965, YC-2A BuNo 148147 was on a test flight when it was ditched into Long Island Sound, where the four crewmen died of exposure.
 On 2 July 1969, Lieutenant Commander Peter Monroe Kennedy was presented the Air Medal with bronze star, the first award for heroic achievement in aerial flights for a carrier onboard delivery aircraft. While returning to Naval Air Station Cubi Point from  operating in Southeast Asia, a failure in the engine gearbox and propeller assembly resulted in the loss of the entire port propeller assembly and substantial portions of the gearbox and nacelle. The separated propeller penetrated the fuselage, causing decompression at over 20,000 feet. Kennedy and his copilot secured the engine, descended to a lower altitude, and returned to Cubi Point.

All aboard are officially listed as missing in action, as their bodies were never recovered.
 On 12 December 1971, C-2A BuNo 152793 crashed en route from Cubi Point to Tan Son Nhat International Airport, killing all four crew members and six passengers.
 On 16 November 1973, C-2A BuNo 152787 crashed into the sea after takeoff from Chania International Airport, killing seven of 10 persons on board.
 On 22 November 2017, C-2A BuNo 162175 from VRC-30 carrying 11 crew and passengers crashed in the waters southeast of Japan's Okinawa Island in the Philippine Sea while in flight to the aircraft carrier . Eight of the 11 were rescued. The aircraft was located on the ocean floor at a depth of  during the last week of December 2017, when a salvage ship used a pinger receiver to locate the aircraft's emergency signal. The Navy announced its intentions to salvage the aircraft and recover the remains of the three sailors expected to be inside, succeeding in doing so in late May 2019.

Specifications (Reprocured C-2A)

See also

References

External links

 U.S. Navy C-2 fact file 
 U.S. Navy Historical Center C-2A Factsheet 
 Private homepage by Boerries Burkhardt with all information of the Grumman C-2A Greyhound

C-002 Greyhound
1960s United States military transport aircraft
High-wing aircraft
Twin-turboprop tractor aircraft
Carrier-based aircraft
Aircraft first flown in 1964